Acraea rileyi is a butterfly in the family Nymphalidae. It is found in the Democratic Republic of the Congo.

Taxonomy
It is a member of the Acraea terpsicore  species group   -   but see also Pierre & Bernaud, 2014

References

Butterflies described in 1931
rileyi
Endemic fauna of the Democratic Republic of the Congo
Insects of the Democratic Republic of the Congo
Butterflies of Africa